The men's 1500 metres in speed skating at the 1972 Winter Olympics took place on 6 February, at the Makomanai Open Stadium.

Records
Prior to this competition, the existing world and Olympic records were as follows:

The following new Olympic record was set.

Results

References

Men's speed skating at the 1972 Winter Olympics